Oliva circinata is a species of sea snail, a marine gastropod mollusk in the family Olividae, the olives.

Subspecies
 Oliva circinata circinata Marrat, 1871
 Oliva circinata jorioi Petuch, 2013
 Oliva circinata tostesi Petuch, 1987

Description
The length of the shell varies between 40 mm and 60 mm.

Distribution
This species occurs in the Atlantic Ocean off North and East Brazil.

References

 Rosenberg, G.; Moretzsohn, F.; García, E. F. (2009). Gastropoda (Mollusca) of the Gulf of Mexico, Pp. 579–699 in: Felder, D.L. and D.K. Camp (eds.), Gulf of Mexico–Origins, Waters, and Biota. Texas A&M Press, College Station, Texas.

External links
 Marrat, F. P. (1870-1871). Monograph of the genus Oliva. In: G.B. Sowerby II (ed.), Thesaurus Conchyliorum, vol. 4 (29-30): 1-46

circinata